Maryann Karinch is an American author, literary agent, and a speaker and consultant on body language.  She is also known for her athletic endeavors including completion of the first Eco-Challenge and regional awards in body building and gymnastics.

Education
Karinch attended Catholic schools in Lebanon, PA and graduated valedictorian of the class of 1970 at Lebanon Catholic High School. She earned her B.A. degree in 1974 and M.A. degree in 1979, both in Speech and Drama, from The Catholic University of America. where she served as sports editor of the university newspaper during her senior year.

Career
While earning her master's degree, Karinch taught briefly at Tabor Academy in Marion, Massachusetts  before becoming managing director of the New Playwrights' Theater in Washington, DC.  She then served as Development Officer for Capital Children's Museum (now National Children's Museum).  For seven years, she was Director of Communications for the Computer and Business Equipment Industry Association (now Information Technology Industry Council), and then headed public relations activities for the Federal Systems Group of Apple, Inc. In 1993, she launched a communications consulting business and began publishing books in 1994. In 2004, she founded The Rudy Agency, a full-service literary agency, and has placed more than 150 properties with commercial publishers. As of December, 2020, she has 32 commercially published works. Karinch is also a blogger for Psychology Today.

Athletics

Karinch held top ranking in intercollegiate gymnastics in the Washington DC area from fall 1971 to spring 1973.

In 1995, she was part of a five-person team that completed the first Eco-Challenge, a 376-mile adventure race staged in southern Utah.  Of the fifty teams that began the grueling ten-day event, only twenty-one officially finished the race.  In 1998, she earned the status of Certified Personal Trainer with the American Council on Exercise, an accreditation she continues to carry.

Published works
Karinch, Maryann; Sima Dimitrijev (April 8, 2021). Trial, Error, and Success. Armin Lear Press. .
Karinch, Maryann; Alastair Storm Browne (February 9, 2021). Cosmic Careers: Exploring the Universe of Opportunities in the Space Industries. HarperCollins Leadership. .
Karinch, Maryann (July 23, 2020) (2nd Ed). Game Plan for Getting Published. Armin Lear Press. .
Karinch, Maryann; Gregory Hartley (November 1, 2019). Get People to Do What You Want: How to Use body Language and Words for Maximum Effect (2nd ed). Red Wheel/Weiser. .
Karinch, Maryann (July 8, 2019). Mature Sexual Intimacy: Making Menopause a Turning Point not an Ending (1st ed). Rowman & Littlefield. .
Karinch, Maryann; James O. Pyle (October 1, 2018). Control the Conversation: How to Charm, Deflect and Defend Your Position Through Any Line of Questioning (1st ed). Red Wheel/Weiser. .
Karinch, Maryann; Robert Kaluza (April 17, 2018). Deepwater Deception: The Truth About the Tragic Blowout & Perversion of American Justice (1st ed). Armin Lear Press .
Karinch, Maryann; Jim McCormick (December 27, 2017). Body Language Sales Secrets: How to Read Prospects and Decode Subconscious Signals to Get Results and Close the Deal (1st ed). Red Wheel/Weiser. .
Karinch, Maryann; Saketh Guntupalli, MD; foreword by Camille Grammer (July 8, 2017). Sex and Cancer: Intimacy, Romance, and Love After Diagnosis and Treatment (1st ed). Rowman & Littlefield. .
Karinch, Maryann; Gregory Hartley (February 20, 2017). The Art of Body Talk: How to Decode Gestures, Mannerisms, and Other Non-Verbal Messages (1st ed). Career Press. .
Karinch, Maryann; Chris Spinelli, DO (December 15, 2015). The Vaccination Debate: Making the Right Choice for You and Your Children (1st ed). New Horizon Press. .
Karinch, Maryann; foreword by E. Peter Earnest (January 19, 2015). Nothing But the Truth: Secrets from Top Intelligence Experts to Control Conversations and Get the Information You Need (1st ed). Career Press. 
Karinch, Maryann; Trevor Crow (October 20, 2013). Forging Healthy Connections: How Relationships Fight Illness, Aging and Depression (1st ed). New Horizon Press. 
Karinch, Maryann; James O. Pyle (January 20, 2014). Find Out Anything from Anyone, Anytime: Secrets of Calculated Questioning from a Veteran Interrogator (1st ed). Career Press. 
Karinch, Maryann; John A. Biever, MD; foreword by Mark Whitacre (August 9, 2012). The Wandering Mind: Understanding Dissociation from Daydreams to Disorders (1st ed). Rowman & Littlefield. .
Karinch, Maryann; E. Peter Earnest (November 17, 2010). Business Confidential: Lessons for Corporate Success from Inside the CIA (1st ed). AMACOM. .
Karinch, Maryann; Gregory Hartley (February 2, 2011). The Most Dangerous Business Book You'll Ever Read (1st ed). John Wiley & Sons. .

References

Living people
American women writers
Catholic University of America alumni
People from Estes Park, Colorado
Year of birth missing (living people)